Erik Gustav Ahlman (8 May 1892 – 27 August 1952) was a Finnish philosopher and linguist. Ahlman initiated his academic career as a classical philologist.

Ahlman was born in Turku. He worked as a theoretical science education professor at the Jyväskylä College of Education from 1935 to 1948 (rector from 1940 to 1948) and then Professor of Moral Philosophy of the University of Helsinki from 1948–1952. His most important works are Arvojen ja välineiden maailma (1920), Kulttuurin perustekijöitä (1939) and Ihmisen probleemi (1953).

Erik Ahlman's daughter was a professor of psychology at the University of Turku, Kirsti Lagerspetz (1932–2001). The family's philosophical traditions have continued at the University of Turku with philosophy professor Eerik Lagerspetz (1956–) and Åbo Akademi University philosophy professor Olli Lagerspetz (1963–).

References

1892 births
1952 deaths
Linguists from Finland
Scientists from Turku
Academic staff of the University of Helsinki
20th-century Finnish philosophers
Finnish philologists
Academic staff of the University of Jyväskylä
20th-century linguists
20th-century philologists